Envision Healthcare is a United States healthcare company and national hospital-based physician group.

History 
In December 2016, Envison and AMSURG merged, and shortly thereafter the company's stock replaced Legg Mason in the S&P 500 index. 

In 2017, the company's subsidiary EmCare, came under scrutiny due to healthcare consumers being shocked by high medical bills from Envision's out-of-network healthcare providers. In August 2017, Envision sold its ambulance unit, American Medical Response, for $2.4 billion to KKR, which it subsequently merged with a similar company it had already owned. In 2017, the company reported a net loss of $232.5 million on revenue of $7.8 billion.

In June 2018, KKR announced that it was acquiring the rest of Envision for $9.9 billion, including the assumption or repayment of debt.

In February 2020, Envision appointed James Rechtin as CEO. In April 2020, they were considering bankruptcy. In October 2020, it was announced that Cigna and Envision had renewed their agreement to include Envision's clinicians as in-network providers to Cigna's members.

In September 2022, Moody's warned that Envision Healthcare could be at risk of bankruptcy.

References

External links 
 

Companies based in Nashville, Tennessee
Companies formerly listed on the New York Stock Exchange
Health care companies based in Tennessee
Medical outsourcing companies of the United States
2018 mergers and acquisitions
Kohlberg Kravis Roberts companies